Izet is a Bosnian variant of the Turkish given name Izzet from Arabic عزة, meaning honor, greatness. Alternatively, it may refer to the first sighting of vegetation after volcanic eruptions. It may refer to:

Izet Arslanović (born 1973), Bosnian footballer
Izet Dibra (1878-1964), Albanian politician
Izet Duraku, director of the National Centre of Cultural Property Inventory (NCCPI) in Albania
Izet Hajdarhodžić (1929-2006), Croatian actor
 Izet Hajrović (1991–), Bosnian footballer
 Izet Hdanov (born 1983), Ukrainian activist and politician of Crimean Tatar ethnic origin
 Izet Ibrahimi (born 1962), Albanian politician
Izet Nanić (1965–1995), Bosnian military officer
Izet Redžepagić (1955-2007), Yugoslav footballer
Izet Sarajlić (1930–2002), Bosnian poet, historian of philosophy, essayist and translator.
Fictional:

 Izet Fazlinović, character from Lud, zbunjen, normalan

See also
Izzat (given name)
Izzet

Bosnian masculine given names